Kinnekulle Ring is a  motor racing circuit in Kinnekulle, Sweden. The circuit was built in 1969. The circuit is mainly used for the national events, however it also hosted some international events, such as European Formula Two Championship, European Rallycross Championship, Norwegian Touring Car Championship, and lastly F4 Danish Championship.

Lap records 

The official race lap records at the Kinnekulle Ring are listed as:

References

External links 
 

Motorsport venues in Sweden
1969 establishments in Sweden
Buildings and structures in Västra Götaland County
Sport in Västra Götaland County